Fusulculus albus is a species of sea snail, a marine gastropod mollusk in the family Pseudolividae.

Description
The length of the shell attains 7.9 mm.

Distribution
This marine species occurs off New Caledonia.

References

 Bouchet, P. & Vermeij, G., 1998. Two new deep-water Pseudolividae (Neogastropoda) from the south-west Pacific. The Nautilus 111(2): 47-52

External links
 MNHN, Paris: holotype

albus
Gastropods described in 1998